Yoo Min-kyu (born September 18, 1987) is a South Korean actor.

Career
Yoo began working as a runway and magazine model in 2006. He then joined and won the audition competition Flower Boy Casting: Oh! Boy in 2011, which led to his acting debut in the television series Flower Band in 2012. In 2014, Yoo played leading roles in Kim Jho Gwangsoo's indie film One Night (part of the omnibus One Night Only), and another cable series Be Arrogant.

On 23 December 2021, Yoo decided not to renew the contract with Management SOOP. On January 24, 2022 announced that Yoo had signed an exclusive contract with Lead Entertainment.

Filmography

Television series

Film

Variety show

Music video

Theater

References

External links 
 Official website 
 
 Yoo Min-kyu Fan Cafe at Daum 
 
 

1987 births
Living people
South Korean male film actors
South Korean male television actors
South Korean male stage actors